The , also known as the Trans-Tokyo Bay Expressway, is an expressway that is mainly made up of a bridge–tunnel combination across Tokyo Bay in Japan. It connects the city of Kawasaki in Kanagawa Prefecture with the city of Kisarazu in Chiba Prefecture, and forms part of National Route 409.  With an overall length of 23.7 km, it includes a 4.4 km bridge and 9.6 km tunnel underneath the bay—the fourth-longest underwater tunnel in the world.

Overview 
An artificial island, marks the transition between the bridge and tunnel segments and provides a rest stop with restaurants, shops, and amusement facilities. A distinctive tower standing above the middle of the tunnel, the Kaze no Tō (の, "the tower of wind"), supplies air to the tunnel, its ventilation system powered by the bay's almost-constant winds.

The ¥1.44 trillion (US$11.2 billion) roadway opened on December 18, 1997, after 23 years of planning and nine years of construction.

The Tokyo Bay Aqua-Line shortened the drive between Chiba and Kanagawa, two important industrial areas, from 90 to 15 minutes, and also helped cut travel time from Tokyo and Kanagawa to the seaside leisure spots of the southern Bōsō Peninsula. Before it opened, the trip entailed a 100  km journey along Tokyo Bay and pass through central Tokyo.

An explicit goal of the Aqua-Line was to redirect vehicular flow away from central Tokyo, but the expensive toll has meant only a limited reduction in central-Tokyo traffic.

Many highway bus services now use the Tokyo Bay Aqua-Line, including lines from Tokyo Station, Yokohama Station, Kawasaki Station, Shinagawa Station, Shibuya Station, Shinjuku Station and Haneda Airport to Kisarazu, Kimitsu, Nagaura station, Ichihara, Mobara, Tōgane, Kamogawa, Katsuura and Tateyama.

Tolls 
The cash toll for a single trip on the Aqua-Line is ¥3,140 for ordinary-size cars (¥2,510 for kei cars); however, using the ETC (electronic toll collection) system, the fare is ¥2320 (¥1860 for kei cars). The ETC toll is reduced to ¥1000 on Saturdays, Sundays and Holidays. In general, tolls for usage of the Aqua-Line in either direction are collected at the mainline toll plaza on the Kisarazu end.

See also 

 List of bridge–tunnels
 Chesapeake Bay Bridge–Tunnel
 Busan–Geoje Fixed Link
 Hong Kong–Zhuhai–Macau Bridge
 Bataan–Cavite Interlink Bridge

References

External links 

 Japan Highways site (in Japanese)
  East Nippon Expressway Company
 NEXCO East's info regarding U-turns at Umi-hotaru (in Japanese)
 
 
 
 
 
 
 
 
 

Buildings and structures in Chiba Prefecture
Buildings and structures in Kawasaki, Kanagawa
Toll bridges in Japan
Toll tunnels in Japan
Road tunnels in Japan
Undersea tunnels in Asia
Bridges completed in 1997
Regional High-Standard Highways in Japan
Roads in Chiba Prefecture
Tokyo Bay
Tunnels completed in 1997
Transport in Kawasaki, Kanagawa
Articles containing video clips
Immersed tube tunnels in Asia
Bridge–tunnels in Asia
Expressways in Japan
1997 establishments in Japan